Two ships in service with the Imperial Japanese Navy were named Yamato:

 , was the lead ship of her class of battleships, launched in 1940 and sunk in 1945 

See also
 
 Yamato (disambiguation)

Imperial Japanese Navy ship names
Japanese Navy ship names